From Dusk Till Dawn 3: The Hangman's Daughter is a 2000 American Western horror film directed by P. J. Pesce. It serves as a prequel to the 1996 film From Dusk till Dawn. It was released directly to video and was nominated at the 26th Saturn Awards for "Best Home Video Release". In late 2010, the production of a fourth film in the series was discussed, but, as of August 2012, further work on this possibility has not been revealed. In late 2013, a TV series began a production.

Plot 
In 1913 Mexico, American author Ambrose Bierce experiences a nightmare in which he dies at the hands of Pancho Villa. (In reality, Bierce disappeared after claiming he was traveling to Mexico to report on the ongoing revolution). Bierce wakes and talks to a local bartender about his intentions to join Pancho Villa's revolutionary army. He joins a stagecoach transporting a newlywed couple, John and Mary Newlie, who are traveling to Mexico to preach Christianity. Meanwhile, Johnny Madrid, a dangerous local outlaw, escapes from the gallows and kidnaps his hangman Mauricio's beautiful 19-year-old teenage daughter Esmeralda. Madrid receives assistance from Catherine Reece, a young woman who wants to become Madrid's apprentice as an outlaw. Madrid meets with his gang with Mauricio and a local posse on their trail. They later rob Bierce's stagecoach because of Reece's belief that Bierce possesses an invaluable object. The gang does not find anything of value, with Bierce claiming he is the invaluable object, as he intends to join with Pancho Villa. Annoyed by this, Madrid leaves Reece hanging in the desert. The posse finds her, using her to track the two.

As night falls, all the parties coincidentally seek shelter in an isolated inn called La Tetilla Del Diablo (the Titty Twister from the first film) that also serves as a brothel. They meet Ezra Traylor, a businessman heading to the U.S. Mauricio is the only one who knows that a group of vampires run the establishment, led by the high priestess, Quixtla, who is immediately drawn to Esmeralda. As night falls, John gets into a fight with one of Madrid's men, drawing blood. The vampires eventually reveal themselves, lock the exit and attack the patrons. They kill all of Mauricio's men and the remnants of Madrid's gang except for Joaquin and Madrid. Vampire women overcome and feed on Ezra and quickly becomes a vampire. He grabs the helpless Mary and hypnotizes and bites her. Madrid, Bierce, Reece, John, Esmeralda, Mauricio, and Joaquin manage to escape into the dungeons beneath the building and try to work together to find a way out.

Mary rises as a vampire and goes after the group, revealing that John is a fraud who only married Mary for her father's money. John eventually kills her. Joaquin, who escaped with them, hides a bite he received from a prostitute earlier. As they continue through the catacombs, he turns and bites John. John kills Joaquin. Doomed, he persuades Madrid to stake him to prevent him from turning. As the remaining survivors keep going, Bierce admits to reading in the papers that Reece is an outlaw who killed her entire family. The group eventually ends up back at the bar entrance, only to find Quixtla and the vampires waiting for them. She reveals that Esmeralda is the dhampir daughter of Quixtla and Mauricio and will become a full-fledged vampire princess named Santánico Pandemonium. Mauricio took her away, hoping to raise her as a normal human, and tried to kill her unsuccessfully. Thanks to his mistreatment and Madrid's kidnapping, she has been led back to Quixtla.

Madrid, Mauricio, Bierce, and Reece are hung upside-down to be fed on later as Quixtla and Esmeralda's vampire grandmother transform Esmeralda into a full-fledged vampire princess, renaming her Santánico Pandemonium. Madrid manages to break from his bonds and free the others. Reece is bitten in the scuffle while Madrid kills Ezra. Santánico kills her grandmother, then bites and turns her father into a vampire, but he manages to open the entranceway and kills Quixtla with sunlight before the change finishes, allowing Madrid and Bierce to escape while Santánico hides from the sunlight. Santánico screams for Madrid not to leave her as the entrance closes. Madrid looks away sadly and joins Ambrose's quest to join Pancho Villa's army. As they leave, the camera zooms out to show the Mayan temple behind the vampires' building, referencing the first film.

After the closing credits, Bierce's legendary disappearance has an answer. He survived into current times and has been telling a patron the story. As he leaves, Ambrose tells him that he has proof. He then reveals that Quixtla actually bit him as they fell outside the bar because he is now a vampire. He rips the patron's heart out and bites it as the film ends.

Cast 
 Marco Leonardi as Johnny Madrid
 Michael Parks as Ambrose Bierce
 Ara Celi as Esmeralda / Santánico Pandemonium
 Sônia Braga as Quixtla
 Rebecca Gayheart as Mary Newlie
 Orlando Jones as Ezra Traylor
 Temuera Morrison as Mauricio / The Hangman
 Lennie Loftin as John Newlie
 Danny Trejo as Charlie 'Razor Charlie'
 Jordana Spiro as Catherine Reece
 Danny Keogh as Bartender
 Peter Butler as Pancho Villa
 Melissa Gilbert as Wedding Dress Whore
 P. J. Pesce as Man In Bar

Release 
The American Cinematheque held the West Coast premiere at Grauman's Egyptian Theatre on October 30, 1999.

Reception 
Rotten Tomatoes, a review aggregator, reports that 22% of nine surveyed critics gave the film a positive review; the average rating was 4/10. Mike Emery of the Houston Chronicle wrote that the film "isn't terribly bad" but is too derivative and only for gore hounds. Matt Serafini of Dread Central rated it 2/5 stars and wrote that the original film should not have had any sequels.  Nathan Rabin of The A.V. Club wrote: "Being competent is no great achievement, but for undiscriminating gore fans, it should be enough to make Dawn 3 a passable evening's entertainment".  G. Noel Cross of DVD Talk rated it 4/5 stars and called it "a smart sequel that delivers mucho bang for the peso". Gordon Sullivan of DVD Verdict called it "a serviceable little action horror flick that takes a timeworn premise and adds its own small filigrees".

See also 
 Vampire film

References

External links 
 
 
 

1999 films
1999 direct-to-video films
1999 horror films
1990s Western (genre) horror films
A Band Apart films
American Western (genre) horror films
American action horror films
American direct-to-video films
American supernatural horror films
Buena Vista Home Entertainment direct-to-video films
Dimension Films films
Direct-to-video horror films
Direct-to-video prequel films
1990s English-language films
Films about Pancho Villa
Films set in 1913
Films set in Mexico
Films scored by Nathan Barr
Films with screenplays by Robert Rodriguez
From Dusk till Dawn (franchise)
Troublemaker Studios films
American vampire films
Films directed by P. J. Pesce
1990s American films
American prequel films